Grace Episcopal Church is an historic Episcopal church building located at 405 2nd Avenue, North East, in Jamestown, Stutsman County, North Dakota. Designed in the Late Gothic Revival style of architecture by British-born Fargo architect George Hancock, it was built 1884 of local fieldstone exterior walls and a wooden roof. Early parish records contain several assertions that George Hancock modeled the church after Christ Episcopal Church (Medway, Massachusetts) which had been opened in 1881, but if he did, it was only in a very general, not specific way. Hancock's later work St. Stephen's Episcopal Church (Casselton, North Dakota) is much more closely related to Christ Church, Medway. On December 3, 1992, Grace Episcopal Church was added to the National Register of Historic Places.

Current status
Grace Episcopal Church is still an active parish in the Episcopal Diocese of North Dakota.

References

External links
 Grace Episcopal Church website

Churches on the National Register of Historic Places in North Dakota
Episcopal church buildings in North Dakota
Stone churches in North Dakota
Gothic Revival church buildings in North Dakota
Churches completed in 1884
Buildings and structures in Jamestown, North Dakota
19th-century Episcopal church buildings
National Register of Historic Places in Stutsman County, North Dakota
1884 establishments in Dakota Territory